Loris Tortori (born 13 October 1988) is an Italian football player. He plays for Fano.

Club career
He made his Serie C debut for Paganese on 23 August 2009 in a game against Lecco.

On 10 September 2019, he joined Foggia.

References

External links
 

1988 births
Footballers from Rome
Living people
Italian footballers
Association football forwards
A.C. Isola Liri players
Paganese Calcio 1926 players
Latina Calcio 1932 players
A.S. Melfi players
FeralpiSalò players
Venezia F.C. players
U.S. Viterbese 1908 players
Carrarese Calcio players
Calcio Foggia 1920 players
Forlì F.C. players
Alma Juventus Fano 1906 players
Serie C players
Serie D players